Chaun Thompson (born May 22, 1980) is a former American football linebacker. He was originally drafted by the Cleveland Browns in the second round of the 2003 NFL Draft. He played college football at West Texas A&M.

College career
He finished his career at West Texas A&M with 358 tackles, 8 sacks, 40 tackles for losses, 3 fumble recoveries, 2 forced fumbles, and 3 interceptions.

External links
Houston Texans bio

1980 births
Living people
People from Mount Pleasant, Texas
Players of American football from Texas
American football linebackers
West Texas A&M Buffaloes football players
Cleveland Browns players
Houston Texans players